China Sky (aka Pearl Buck's China Sky) is a 1945 RKO Pictures film based on the novel by Pearl S. Buck.  It was directed by Ray Enright and featured movie idol Randolph Scott, teamed with Ruth Warrick, Ellen Drew and Anthony Quinn. Although set in wartime China, Quinn and other lead actors portrayed Chinese characters, in keeping with other period films that employed Caucasian actors in Asian roles.

China Sky was one of the last in a succession of wartime films depicting the Chinese confronting Japanese invaders that included: A Yank on the Burma Road (1942), China Girl (1942), Flying Tigers (1942), China (1943), Behind the Rising Sun (1943), Thirty Seconds Over Tokyo (1944), Dragon Seed (1944), God Is My Co-Pilot (1945) and China's Little Devils, released May 27, 1945. Similar to many of the other treatments, Chinese characters in China Sky were in secondary or subservient roles, with the versatile and highly malleable Quinn taking on another nationality, having already played countless other roles as an Indian, Mafia don, Hawaiian chief, Filipino freedom-fighter, French pirate, Spanish bullfighter and Arab sheik.

Plot
Dr. Gray Thompson, an American missionary doctor, works alongside Dr. Sara Durand in a hospital he has built in a small hilltop Chinese village, while Japanese forces descend on China.  When Gray returns from a trip, he shocks Sara (who is in love with him) by introducing his new socialite wife, Louise. Bored and feeling out of place, Louise tries to persuade him to give up his dangerous cause. In the midst of aerial bombing attacks on the village, Dr. Thompson unselfishly helps the local residents, and especially the insurgent leader Chen-Ta, who loves nurse Siu-Mei, betrothed to Dr. Kim, a sympathetic Chinese/Korean doctor.

Col. Yasuda, a high-ranking, injured Japanese prisoner, manipulates Dr. Kim into sending a (coded) message, purportedly from Louise, to his side that the village is secretly harboring an ammunition dump. Gray and the others become puzzled when Japanese airplanes stop attacking their village. When Japanese paratroops descend on the village, Gray organizes the defense and sends a messenger to Chen Ta. During the brutal fighting, Yasuda fatally shoots Dr. Kim and grazes Gray. A distraught Louise runs out into the line of fire and is killed. The Japanese are defeated when Chen Ta and his men arrive on horseback. He promises to return for Siu Mei after the invaders have been driven out of their country. As the air raids begin again, the two doctors stoically face the next air raid together.

Cast
As appearing in China Sky, (main roles and screen credits identified):
 Randolph Scott as Dr. Gray Thompson  
 Ruth Warrick as Dr. Sara Durand 
 Ellen Drew as Louise Thompson
 Anthony Quinn as Chen-Ta 
 Carol Thurston as Siu-Mei 
 Richard Loo as Col. Yasuda (Japanese: 陸軍大佐安田, Rikugun-Taisa Yasuda)
 Ducky Louie as Little Goat 
 Philip Ahn as Dr. Kim 
 Benson Fong as Chung 
 H.T. Tsiang as Magistrate 
 Chin Kuang Chow as Little Charlie

Production
Although Pearl Buck's novel had been optioned for film production in 1941, one nagging plotline held up actual work as screenwriters dealt with an unsympathetic anti-American Chinese character. Phillip Ahn's character was ultimately changed from the American schooled Chinese Dr. Chung to a half Korean and half Japanese character. His name, Kim Han Soo may have been inspired by real life Korean agent, Killsoo Han. During its lengthy and troubled rewrite as a succession of screenwriters, directors and production staff were assigned to the project, the studio considered a number of stars for feature roles including Claudette Colbert, Luise Rainer, Margo, Maureen O'Hara, Kim Hunter and Paul Henreid. The key role of the Japanese antagonist was played by Richard Loo whose Hollywood career in the war was accentuated by a large repertoire of sinister spies, enemy agents and military officers.

The RKO Pictures backlot China set over the years was used as a locale in a number of films and television series. It was originally part of the Jerusalem city for Cecil B. DeMille's The King of Kings (1927) and was also redressed and featured as an Arab village in David O. Selznick's The Garden of Allah (1936).  In 1945, the set was dressed for  China Sky.

Reception
Released at the end of World War II, China Sky did represent an attempt to portray the Chinese theatre of operations, but despite the game efforts of its stars, was relegated to "B" fare by its low production values. Its star, Randolph Scott, called it "disappointing." Bosley Crowther, reviewer for The New York Times considered the film a tepid marital melodrama. "The Chinese characters are the typical, self-effacing types to be found on the screen and who probably would be looked upon as curios in Chungking. RKO undoubtedly meant well in producing this film as an expression of American friendship for China, but it seems to us that this is a case where 10,000 words would have been better than one picture." In an early screening in 1944, Variety characterized the film as a less than "spectacular" production bogged down by a plotline that lacks action elements, as "stress is laid on interior sets and romantic conflict".

References

Notes

Citations

Bibliography

 Buck, Pearl S. China Sky. New York: The John Day Company, Inc., 1941.
 Chung, Hye Seung. Hollywood Asian: Philip Ahn and the Politics of Cross-Ethnic Performance. Philadelphia, Pennsylvania: Temple University Press, 2006. .
 Dolan, Edward F. Jr. Hollywood Goes to War. London: Bison Books, 1985. .
 Evans, Alun. Brassey's Guide to War Films. Dulles, Virginia: Potomac Books, 2000. .
 Hyams, Jay. War Movies. New York: W.H. Smith Publishers, Inc., 1984. .
 Koppes, Clayton R. and Gregory D. Black. Hollywood Goes to War: How Politics, Profits and Propaganda Shaped World War II Movies. New York, The Free Press, 1987. .
 Maltin, Leonard. Leonard Maltin's Movie Guide 2009. New York: New American Library, 2009 (originally published as TV Movies, then Leonard Maltin’s Movie & Video Guide), First edition 1969, published annually since 1988. .
 Nott, Robert. The Films of Randolph Scott. Jefferson, North Carolina: McFarland & Company, 2007. .
 Orriss, Bruce. When Hollywood Ruled the Skies: The Aviation Film Classics of World War II. Hawthorne, California: Aero Associates Inc., 1984. .
 Parish, James Robert. The Great Combat Pictures: Twentieth-Century Warfare on the Screen. Metuchen, New Jersey: The Scarecrow Press, 1990. .
 Twomey, Alfred E. and Arthur F. McClure. The Versatiles: A Study of Supporting Character Actors and Actresses in the American Motion Picture, 1930-1955. New York: A.S. Barnes & Company, 1969. .
 Warrick, Ruth with Don Preston. The Confessions of Phoebe Tyler. Englewood Cliffs, New Jersey: Prentice-Hall, 1980. .

External links
 
 
 
 

1945 films
1945 drama films
American drama films
1940s English-language films
Films based on American novels
Films directed by Ray Enright
RKO Pictures films
Second Sino-Japanese War films
Films set in China
World War II films made in wartime
Films scored by Leigh Harline
American black-and-white films
Films based on works by Pearl S. Buck